Anna Igoryevna Kharitonova (born March 12, 1985) is a Russian judoka, who played for the half-lightweight category. She is a multiple-time Russian judo champion and a two-time gold medalist for her division at the European Junior Judo Championships (2006 in Moscow and 2007 in Salzburg, Austria).

Kharitonova represented Russia at the 2008 Summer Olympics in Beijing, where she competed for the women's half-lightweight class (52 kg). She received a bye for the second preliminary round, before losing out by a waza-ari awasete ippon (two full points) and a kata guruma (shoulder wheel) to Portugal's Telma Monteiro.

References

External links
 
 NBC Olympics Profile

Russian female judoka
Living people
Olympic judoka of Russia
Judoka at the 2008 Summer Olympics
Martial artists from Moscow
1985 births
Sambo practitioners at the 2015 European Games
European Games gold medalists for Russia
European Games medalists in sambo
Universiade gold medalists for Russia
Medalists at the 2013 Summer Universiade
20th-century Russian women
21st-century Russian women